The Washington D.C. Temple (formerly the Washington Temple) is the 18th constructed and 16th operating temple of the Church of Jesus Christ of Latter-day Saints (LDS Church). It is located in Kensington, Maryland, United States, just north of Washington, D.C., near the Capital Beltway. The temple was dedicated in 1974 after an open house that attracted over 750,000 people, including several international dignitaries. The temple was the first temple built by the church east of the Mississippi River since 1846, when the original Nauvoo Temple was dedicated.

Its design emulates the Salt Lake Temple with six spires, three on each end, and the building is encased in white Alabama marble.

History

Plans to build the temple were announced on November 15, 1968, with a groundbreaking ceremony held on December 7. Clearing of the land started May 28, 1971. The site chosen for the temple was a  wooded hill purchased in 1962 just north of the Capital Beltway. Only  of the site was cleared to give the area a more remote feeling. It was completed and dedicated in 1974. It was the LDS Church's first U.S. temple built east of the Mississippi River since 1846 and remained the church's only temple in eastern North America until the dedication of the Atlanta Georgia Temple in 1983.

At the time of the temple's completion, it served all Latter-day Saint members in 31 U.S. states and the District of Columbia, seven Canadian provinces, Cuba, Haiti, Puerto Rico, the Bahamas, and the Dominican Republic.  Original cost estimates for the temple were about $15 million. Members of the church within the temple's attendance district were asked to contribute at least $4.5 million. Eventually, local members donated around $6 million for the temple's construction.

At a completion ceremony the church's First Presidency buried a metal box with historical items near a corner of the temple. During the first week of the temple open house, government officials and diplomats from around the world were taken on special tours through the building. The open house continued for seven weeks and over 750,000 people went through the temple. The high number of people that attended the open house was attributed to the large amount of coverage that the temple and church received as it neared completion. Articles about the temple were printed in Time, Newsweek, and U.S. News & World Report. There was also a large press conference held that introduced the temple and church president Spencer W. Kimball. Demand for tickets to the open house was high and the tickets were gone before the first day of tours; times were extended to accommodate more people. Ten dedicatory sessions were held for the temple between November 19 and 22, 1974. Over 40,000 church members attended these dedicatory services.

During a 5.8 magnitude earthquake on August 23, 2011, the temple sustained minor damage to some parts of the exterior. The tops of four spires were knocked off and fell to the ground, as were several pieces of marble from the building's facade. No significant damage was reported to the temple's interior or to the neighboring visitors' center. Repairs were made beginning in September of that year and no disruptions occurred in its normal operating schedule.

The temple closed in March 2018 for renovations to upgrade the mechanical systems and update finishes and furnishings. The renovations were anticipated to be completed in 2020 and the adjacent visitor center was scheduled to be operational throughout the renovation. In February 2020, the church announced that with renovations nearing completion, a public open house would be held from September 24 through October 31, 2020, with the temple scheduled for rededication on Sunday, December 13, 2020. However, due to the coronavirus pandemic, the church announced on June 17, 2020, that the open house and rededication dates would be postponed until large public gatherings are determined to be safe.  On July 20, 2021, the church announced the open house would be scheduled for April 28 through June 4, 2022, with the temple scheduled for rededication on Sunday, June 19, 2022. However, on January 28, 2022, the church announced that the duration of the open house tours would be extended as needed, with the rededication pushed back to August 14, 2022. The church put up banners in the city to promote the event and recorded a virtual tour, led by Gary E. Stevenson and Dale G. Renlund, who serve as members of the Quorum of the Twelve Apostles.

Presidents
Notable presidents of the temple include Franklin D. Richards (1983–1986), David S. King (1990–1993), and F. Melvin Hammond (2005–2008).

Architecture

Designed by architects Fred L. Markham, Harold K. Beecher, Henry P. Fetzer and Keith Wilcox, the Washington D.C. Temple was built with a modern six-spire design based on the design of the Salt Lake Temple, with the three towers to the east representing the Melchizedek priesthood, and the three towers to the west representing the Aaronic priesthood. The temple was designed to be similar in style and form to the Salt Lake Temple so that it would be easily recognized as an LDS Church temple. The temple includes six ordinance rooms and fourteen sealing rooms. The outer walls are covered in white Alabama marble and the spires are coated in 24-carat gold. There are two large stained glass windows on the eastern and westernmost spires.

Location
 
The temple is located in suburban Kensington, Maryland, north of Washington, D.C. It is accessible mainly from the Capital Beltway (Interstate 495) exit 33, but also via the Red Line of the Washington Metro through a limited free shuttle service to and from the Forest Glen station. The look and white color of the Washington D.C. Temple, coupled with its location near the Capital Beltway has made it a local landmark. D.C.-area traffic reports often refer to the "Mormon temple" or "the temple".

Sometime after the temple was constructed, an unknown person painted "Surrender Dorothy" on the girders of a railroad bridge that crosses the Beltway; to drivers approaching the temple from the east, the words appeared like a caption under the building. The Maryland State Police removed the message, which has been repainted from time to time. Church newsletters have cited the graffiti as an example of misconceptions about their religion, although local members of the church generally find the re-appearing inscription amusing rather than offensive.

On August 24, 2018, "Surrender Donald" lettering (referring to US president Donald Trump) was spotted on the same bridge over the Washington Beltway. Evidently, the sign was made of easily removable letters that minimize property damage and was installed between 4 and 5 AM. Reportedly, Claude Taylor and his MadDog PAC claimed responsibility. On November 5, during the 2020 United States presidential election, "Surrender Donald" appeared again – this time in paint.

Festival of Lights
Since 1978 the temple has annually hosted the Festival of Lights at the visitors' center, officially running from December 2 to January 1. The event attracts thousands of visitors who come to view millions of lights on the temple grounds. The festival features live performances by the Mormon Choir of Washington, D.C.; a public lighting ceremony; a narrated outdoor nativity scene; and nightly performances from various regional artists and musicians. Each year, a different ambassador to the United States is invited as a guest speaker at the festival's opening lighting ceremony. For example, in 2011, J. W. "Bill" Marriott, Jr. and his wife, Donna, hosted Brazilian Ambassador to the United States Mauro Vieira, with L. Tom Perry of the Quorum of the Twelve Apostles presiding.

See also

 List of temples of The Church of Jesus Christ of Latter-day Saints
 List of temples of The Church of Jesus Christ of Latter-day Saints by geographic region
 Comparison of temples of The Church of Jesus Christ of Latter-day Saints
 Temple architecture (Latter-day Saints)

References

External links

Washington D.C. Temple Official site
Washington D.C. Temple at ChurchofJesusChristTemples.org
Three Stories About the Mormon Temple
Festival of Lights
Washington D.C. Temple Divine by Design book

Christianity in Montgomery County, Maryland
Kensington, Maryland
Religious buildings and structures completed in 1974
The Church of Jesus Christ of Latter-day Saints in Maryland
Religious buildings and structures in Montgomery County, Maryland
Temples (LDS Church) in the United States
20th-century Latter Day Saint temples
1974 establishments in Maryland
Historic American Buildings Survey in Maryland